The Urban Peasant was a Canadian cooking show starring James Barber. The show was broadcast on CBC Television and was filmed at the CBC Regional Broadcast Centre at CBUT in Vancouver, British Columbia. The show also aired in the United States on The Learning Channel (TLC).

Broadcasters

Past
Canadian Broadcasting Corporation Television network - original broadcast
Food Network Canada - syndicated reruns
 One: the Body, Mind & Spirit channel - syndicated reruns
 Ion Life Channel - syndicated reruns

Books
For a complete listing of books by James Barber see his list of books

Barber has written a number of books, including several companion books to this series:

 The Urban Peasant: Recipes from the Popular Television Cooking Series (1995)
 Peasant's Choice: More of the Best from the Urban Peasant
 Peasant's Choice (1994)
 The Urban Peasant: More than a Cookbook (1993)
 The Urban Peasant Quick & Simple (1991)

1990s Canadian cooking television series
CBC Television original programming
Television shows filmed in Vancouver
2000s Canadian cooking television series
1992 Canadian television series debuts
2000 Canadian television series endings